John Fitzgibbon (born 21 September 1992) is an Irish hurler who plays as a midfielder for the Limerick senior team.

Born in Adare, County Limerick, Fitzgibbon was introduced to hurling in his youth. He enjoyed Harty Cup success at colleges level with Ardscoil Rís while simultaneously enjoying championship successes at underage levels with the Adare club. Fitzgibbon has won one championship medal.

Fitzgibbon made his debut on the inter-county scene at the age of sixteen when he first linked up with the Limerick minor team. He later lined out with the under-21 team. Fitzgibbon made his senior debut during the 2015 Waterford Crystal Cup. He has since gone on to become a regular member of the Limerick senior team.

Honours

Player

 Ardscoil Rís
 Harty Cup (2): 2010, 2011

 Adare
 Limerick Senior Hurling Championship (1): 2009

 Limerick
 Waterford Crystal Cup (1): 2015

References

1992 births
Living people
Adare hurlers
Limerick inter-county hurlers